Joseph Schoen (born July 11, 1979) is an American football executive who is the general manager of the New York Giants, of the National Football League (NFL). Schoen previously served as the assistant general manager for the Buffalo Bills from 2017 to 2021. Schoen began his NFL career as a scout for the Carolina Panthers before serving in the scouting department for the Miami Dolphins from 2008 to 2016 and joining the Bills in 2017.

Early years
A native of Elkhart, Indiana, Schoen played college football at DePauw University as a quarterback as a freshman and wide receiver his final three years, serving as a captain during his senior season. He was also a member of Alpha Tau Omega fraternity. He graduated from DePauw University in 2001 with a communications degree.

Executive career

Carolina Panthers
In 2001, Schoen began his career as a scouting assistant for the Carolina Panthers before being hired as an area scout in 2002.

Miami Dolphins
In 2008, Schoen joined the Miami Dolphins as a national scout. In 2013, he was promoted to assistant director of college scouting and was again promoted to director of player personnel in 2014.

Buffalo Bills
On May 14, 2017, Schoen was hired by the Buffalo Bills as their assistant general manager, reuniting with general manager Brandon Beane, whom Schoen worked with during his time in Carolina. Schoen worked with Brian Daboll, whom he ended up hiring as the Giants head coach after being hired as the Giants general manager. Schoen was there when the team drafted Josh Allen.

New York Giants
On January 21, 2022, Schoen was named the general manager of the New York Giants. Schoen is the first Giants general manager since George Young was hired in 1979 who had no previous ties to the franchise. Schoen's first job as general manager was hiring a new head coach.  He hired Buffalo Bills offensive coordinator Brian Daboll, with whom he was in the Bills organization previously. Schoen also led the draft effort, selecting Oregon Defensive End Kayvon Thibodeaux and Alabama Offensive Tackle Evan Neal, respectively, with the Giants two first round picks.

References

External links
 New York Giants profile

1979 births
Living people
Buffalo Bills executives
Carolina Panthers scouts
DePauw Tigers football players
DePauw University alumni
Miami Dolphins executives
National Football League general managers
New York Giants executives
People from Elkhart, Indiana
All Wikipedia articles written in American English
All stub articles